Lewis and Clark State Park is a public recreation area occupying  on the north shore of the upper reaches of Lake Sakakawea  east of Williston in Williams County, North Dakota. The state park offers fishing, boating, camping, and picnicking.

History
The park is named for Meriwether Lewis and William Clark, the leaders of the Corps of Discovery, which camped near here on April 17, 1805. The North Dakota state parks department added three park units on Lake Sakakawea after the state legislature authorized the leasing of land from the U.S. Army Corps of Engineers in 1971. Lake Sakakawea and Lewis and Clark state parks were established in 1973; Fort Stevenson State Park near Garrison was established in 1974.

Activities and amenities

References

External links
Lewis and Clark State Park North Dakota Parks and Recreation Department
Lewis and Clark State Park Map North Dakota Parks and Recreation Department

State parks of North Dakota
Protected areas established in 1973
1973 establishments in North Dakota
Protected areas of Williams County, North Dakota
Lewis and Clark Expedition